Tipperary Hill, sometimes known as Tipp Hill, is a district in the city of  Syracuse, New York. It is largely settled by immigrants from Ireland, especially from County Tipperary. It makes up half of Syracuse's Far Westside neighborhood.

History
In the 1820s, when the Erie Canal first was built from Albany, New York to Buffalo, New York, the Irish were the chief laborers.  Syracuse is about the middle of the route, the "hub" of the system.  When the canal was finished many of the Irish settled west of Syracuse on a hill overlooking the canal. This area became known as Tipperary Hill.

The Green on Top Traffic Light
When the city first started to install traffic signal lights in the 1920s they put one at a major intersection on Tipperary Hill, on the corner of Tompkins Street and Milton Avenue. Some Irish youths, incensed that anyone would dare to put the "British" red above the "Irish" green, broke the light.  The city replaced it but the Irish broke the replacement.  After a few rounds of this the city decided that if they wanted a light at that intersection, they had better put the signal up inverted, and so they did.

Tipperary Hill in Modern Times
In recent years some long time neighborhood residents of Irish ancestry and local business owners gathered resources and encouraged the city first to demolish an old run-down commercial building and then in 1997 to build a small park, the Tipperary Hill Memorial Park, and erect a statue, the Tipperary Hill Heritage Memorial. The memorial is dedicated to those who, in their opinions, were brave sons of Ireland who had stood up to City Hall and won.  The statue was created by Dexter Benedict. The park and statue are still there, as is the traffic light.  On the eve of every Saint Patrick's Day, someone (or ones) goes out and paints a green shamrock underneath the light.

Although most people in Syracuse know about the Tipp Hill neighborhood there is little agreement as to the exact boundaries of the neighborhood. Before 1886, the entire far west side of what is now Syracuse from Burnet Park north to Milton Avenue in Solvay was known as the Village of Geddes. When the village of Geddes joined the city, there were only two churches in the neighborhood: St. Patrick's Church and The Geddes Methodist Church. Many Irish immigrants were attracted to the neighborhood nearest to St. Patrick's Church and area factories.

External links
 Tipperary Hill Neighborhood Association
 Top 'o the Hill
 Living on Tipperary Hill (PDF article in a city publication)
 Syracuse St. Patrick's Parade
 The Shamrock Run of Tipperary Hill
 St. Patrick’s Day in Syracuse: Where Green Takes Precedence

Neighborhoods in Syracuse, New York
Irish-American neighborhoods